Hamodes propitia is a moth in the family Erebidae first described by Félix Édouard Guérin-Méneville in 1831. It is found in the north-eastern Himalayas, Myanmar, Thailand, Borneo, Sumatra, Taiwan, from the Philippines east to Queensland, the Carolines (Palau) and the Solomon Islands.

There is sexual dimorphism in adults. Males are yellow with diffuse blackish markings and females are yellowish olive-brown with uniform shading.

The larvae feed on Dalbergia species. They have a grey body with black and white speckling and a greyish black head. Pupation takes place in a folded leaf in a pupa with a heavy powdery bloom.

References

Moths described in 1832
Calpinae